Coleophora sinensis (Chinese  larch  casebearer) is a moth of the family Coleophoridae. It is found in Shanxi and Hebei provinces of China.

The larvae feed on the needles of Larix gmelinii var. principis-rupprechtii.

References

sinensis
Moths of Asia
Moths described in 1983